The 2021 Euroformula Open Championship was a multi-event motor racing championship for single-seater open wheel formula racing cars that was held across Europe. The championship featured drivers competing in Euroformula Open Championship specification Dallara 320 chassis cars. It was the eighth Euroformula Open Championship season.

Teams and drivers 
All teams utilized the Dallara 320 chassis.

Race calendar 
A provisional seven-round calendar was announced on 26 September 2020, with the option to add another round at Hockenheimring. A plan to resurrect the Pau Grand Prix after it was cancelled in 2020 due to the COVID-19 pandemic did not come to fruition. The calendar was then further concretized on 3 December 2020, adding an event in Imola and leaving a ninth event to be announced. On 9 March 2021, the Portimão round shifted one week later, and it would be the official support round of the 2021 Portuguese Grand Prix. On 27 April 2021, it was confirmed that the series would be held over eight rounds.

In early 2021, it was announced that for the 2021 season the series would switch to a three-race format per round, with only one qualifying session and the other two race grids determined by a top-six reversed grid and the fastest laps from the first two races respectively.

Championship standings 
In 2021, a rule was introduced that granted two extra points per race to the driver that gained the most positions.

Drivers' championship 

 Points were awarded as follows:

Rookies' championship 

 Points were awarded as follows:

Teams' championship 
 
 Points were awarded as follows:

Notes

References

External links 
 

Euroformula Open Championship seasons
Euroformula Open
Euroformula Open Championship